Nurre-Royston House is a historic house in St. Bernard, Ohio. It was listed in the National Register of Historic Places on January 8, 2009.

Notes 

Houses on the National Register of Historic Places in Ohio
Houses in Hamilton County, Ohio
National Register of Historic Places in Hamilton County, Ohio